Asif Abdulhai Mulla

(born 5 May 1980) is an Indian-born Canadian cricketer. He is a right-handed batsman and a Wicket-keeper.

He made his One Day International debut for Canada in Potchefstroom against the Netherlands in 2006–07, although he had previously played for the USA's under 16 side.

Asif Mulla was the fourth batsman to be dismissed on a duck in the first ball of the innings of a T20I and was also the first batsman to be dismissed on a duck in the first ball of a T20I match when batting first.

References

External links
 
 Statistical summary from CricketArchive.

1980 births
Canadian cricketers
Canada One Day International cricketers
Canada Twenty20 International cricketers
Cricketers at the 2007 Cricket World Cup
Living people
Mulla, Asif
Canadian sportspeople of Indian descent
Indian cricketers
Cricketers from Ahmedabad
Wicket-keepers